The 1932 Whittier Poets football team was an American football team that represented Whittier College in the Southern California Conference (SCC) during the 1932 college football season. In its third season under head coach Wallace Newman, the team compiled a 10–1 record (5–1 against conference opponents) and won the SCC championship. Tackle Bob Gibbs was the team captain. The team played its home games at Hadley Field in Whittier, California.

Role of Richard Nixon
Richard Nixon played for the team at the tackle position, and occasionally at end. Though typically a reserve, Nixon was the team's starting left tackle in its October 28 victory over the 160th Infantry team. The team's waterboy, Harold Litten, recalled that Nixon was uncoordinated and "had two left feet" but was a leader: "But, boy, was he an inspiration! He was always talking it up. That's why Chief let him hang around. He was one of those inspirational guys every team needs."

Coach Newman in 1969 said the following of Nixon's role on the team: "No, he never did get a letter, he wasn't that good. But what a scrapper. I remember some of the boys then telling what a licking Dick was taking. And we all marveled at the way he got up and came back for more. . . . Dick had enthusiasm and drive, you betcha. And no one had more moxie. To be a sub, and as light as he was, even then, was rugged. He was practice bait. I don't know if I could have taken the beating he took. Dick liked the battle, though, and the smell of the sweat."

Nixon later said that he admired coach Newman more than any man he had known other than his father.

Schedule

References

Whittier
Whittier Poets football seasons
Southern California Intercollegiate Athletic Conference football champion seasons
Whittier Poets football